Jaunpur district is a district in the Varanasi Division of the Indian state of Uttar Pradesh. The district headquarters is the city of Jaunpur which is situated on the banks of the Gomti River.  It is located 228 km southeast of the state capital Lucknow. 65 km northwest of Varanasi and 732 km southeast of New Delhi. The district has two Lok Sabha seats and nine Vidhan Sabha seats. According to the 2011 census, Jaunpur has a gender ratio of 1,018 females to 1,000 males, the highest in Uttar Pradesh. The main languages spoken in the district is Hindi and Urdu.

Geography

The district of Jaunpur is situated in the northwest part of Varanasi Division. Its attitude varies from 261 ft to 290 ft above sea level.

Rivers
Gomti and Sai are its main parental rivers. Besides these, Varuna, Basuhi, Pili. Mamur and Gangi are the smaller rivers here. The rivers Gomti and Basuhi divide the district into nearly four equal landmasses. Jaunpur district is often affected by the disaster of floods.

Climate
Jaunpur district has a climate consistent with that of the Northern Plain and Central Highlands including the Aravalli range, hot semi-arid eco-region 4.3 and hot dry ecoregion 9.2. The monsoon season occurs from the third week of June to the first week of October. Normally, there are 46 rain days per year of which 31 occur in the monsoon season. The district regularly suffers drought and pestilence.

Topography
The topography of the district is a flat plain undulating with shallow river valleys. The main permanently flowing rivers are the Gomti and the Sai. The rivers of Jaunpur flow from northwest to southeast and the land slopes in the same direction. Thus, there is a more elevated area in the northwest and a less elevated area of land in the southeast.

Geology
Beneath the surface of the district of Jaunpur, is a thick mantle consisting of the quaternary sediments (silt, sand and clay) of the Ganga river system. Below is vindhya range bedrock. Mineral deposits are rare but there is limestone as a conglomerate kanker in nodular and block forms. The limestone can be used in building. Earthquakes have been recorded, the largest in 1927 and 1954.

Demographics 

In 2011, an official census was made in Jaunpur district. It recorded a population of 4,494,204 of which 2,258,437 were female and 2,217,635 male making it 7th most populated district in whole state. Jaunpur district has population density of 1,113 persons per km2. Between 2001 and 2011, the population of Jaunpur district grew 14.89%. Literacy increased from 59.84 to 73.66 percent. In 2011, 86.06 percent of men were literate and 61.7 percent of women. Children under six years formed 14.37% of the population. Scheduled Castes made up 22.04% of the population.

Jaunpur ranks seventh in terms of population in the state and ranks first in terms of sex ratio (1,024). There are 663,513 households in the district accounting for 2% of the total households in the U.P. The average size of households in the district is 6.8 persons. Urban population in the district is only 7.7% of total population.

Languages

At the time of the 2011 Census of India, 92.65% of the population in the district spoke Hindi, 3.58% Bhojpuri, 1.90% Urdu and 1.73% Awadhi as their first language.

Governance

Divisions
Within the district, there are two national lower house constituencies, Lok Sabha, of which Jaunpur constituency is entirely in the district, and nine state lower house constituencies, Vidhan Sabha. Jaunpur district has six administrative subdivisions (Tahsils).

Tahsils

 Shahganj
 Badlapur
 Machhali Shahar
 Jaunpur
 Mariahu
 Kerakat.

Development Blocks
Jaunpur district is further divided into twenty-one "development blocks".

 Sondhi (Shahganj)
 Suithakala
 Khuthan
 Karanja Kala
 Badlapur
 Maharajganj
 Sujanganj
 Baksha
 Mungra Badshahpur
 Machhali Shahar
 Mariahu
 Barsathi
 Rampur
 Ramnagar
 Jalalpur
Kerakat
 Dobhi
 Muftiganj
 Dharmapur
 Bijor
 Sirkoni

Thanas
There are also twenty-six police districts (Thanas).

 Kotwali
 Sadar
 Line Bazar
 Zafarabad
 KhetaSarai
 Shahganj
 Sarpatahan
 Kerakat
 Chandwak
 Jalalpur
 Sarai Khwaja
 Gaura Badshahpur
 Badlapur
 Khuthan
 Singra
 Baksha
 Sujanganj
 Maharajganj
 Mungra Badshahpur
Pawara
Machhlishahr
 Meerganj
 Sikrara
 Mariahu
 Rampur
 Barsathi
 Nevadhiya
 Sureri
 Baserawan 
 Kaserawan 
 Janghai

Economy
The district's main economical activity is agriculture and allied sector. Jaunpur is the fastest developing area in eastern Uttar Pradesh with skill development, quality education and good infrastructure.

Agriculture
The main field crops of Jaunpur district are: rice, maize, pigeon pea, pearl millet, blackgram wheat and chickpea. Other crops are onion and potato and crops for fodder. The crops are grown with both rainfall and irrigation. There are cattle (both local low yielding and crossbred), and local low-yielding buffalo as well as goats, sheep, backyard chickens and pigs and occasional dairy farms. Approximately 29% of Jaunpur's population is employed. Approximately 40% of those employed work in manufacturing, 26% work in trade and commerce, 19% work in other services, 8% work in transport and communication, 4% work in agriculture, 2% work in construction, and 2% are marginal workers. There are 43 government reservoirs and many more private water sources.

Industry
There is little heavy industry in Jaunpur. The Varanasi Jaunpur highway allows for some industrial economic development. A cotton mill was operational near Karanja Kala but has now been replaced by a medical college and there are some textile manufacturers. Other manufactured products include perfume (jasmine oil and attar) and incense, furniture, carpets, chemical fertiliser and cement. Tertiary and service industries include repair workshops, print shops and internet cafes. There is a special economical zone located at Allahabad road near Mungra Badshahpur the Sathariya Industrial area or SIDA. Jaunpur has a problem of poor infrastructure development. Like many other districts of eastern Uttar Pradesh, Jaunpur has poor road quality and a lack of electricity supply. National highway number 56 between Lucknow and Varanasi cross from Jaunpur.

Agro-park in Varanasi near Babatpur airport on Varanasi-Jaunpur highway is said to boost the food-processing industry in the region.

Transport

Roadways 
Jaunpur is well-connected to Lucknow, Gorakhpur, Varanasi, Allahabad and other cities like Azamgarh,Ayodhya, Mirzapur, Janghai, Sultanpur, Kerakat, Ghazipur etc. Mariahu NH-56, SH-36 are the roadways connecting all major cities to Jaunpur. The major bus stations are in Jaunpur city and Machhlishahr. Road dividers are also being built to avoid traffic jams.

Railways 
Jaunpur is well-connected with all major cities of India thanks to Indian Railways. It has four major railway stations: Jaunpur City Railway Station(JOP) and Jaunpur Junction (JNU), Shahganj Junction (SHG), Janghai Junction, Kerakat railway station (KCT). Zafarabad (ZBD) also a railway station where's many train routes are diverted i.e. Allahababd, Varanasi, Lucknow Via Sultanpur, Lucknow via Shahganj, Ghazipur via Jaunpur junction.

Following is the list of all junctions and halt stations in Jaunpur Districts:

 Jaunpur Junction                         
 Shahganj Junction
 Zafrabad Junction
 Janghai Junction
 Jaunpur City
 Mahagava Halt
 Mehrava
 Mani Kalan Halt
 Kheta Sarai
 Yadavendranagar
 Muftiganj
 Gangauli
 Kerakat 
 Dobhi 
 Daudhondha
 Sirkoni
 Jalalganj
 Trilochan
 Baksha
 Sarai Harkhu
 Shri Krishna Nagar
 Harpalganj
 Salakhpur
 Mariyahu
 Bhannor
 Barsathi
 Jarauna
 Nibhapur
 Badshahpur

Airways 

The nearest airport is Lal Bahadur Shastri Airport in Varanasi, which is roughly 39 km (24 mi) from the city. The other nearest airport to Jaunpur is in Prayagraj which is roughly 142 km (88 mi) away.

Historic places and sights

Atala Masjid

Firoz Shah III began the construction of the Atala Masjid in 1393. The Atala masjid is model of Indo-Iran architecture. The Atala became a model for other Masjids in the Jaunpur district. Architecturally, it retained and advanced the element of monumentalism. The entrance has three massive stone pylons. The central one consists of a high arch between two sloping towers. These are decorated with arched niches and stone screened windows.

Jhanjhari Masjid
The Jhanjhari Masjid, on the north bank of the Gomti river, was built by Ibrahim in the Sipah locality of Jaunpur township. It was a residence of Ibrahim himself, as well as a place for saints, scholars (pandits) and the army (who kept animals such as elephants, camels, horses and mules). After human destruction and flood damage, only the facade remains. Some of the stones from this masjid were used in the construction of the Shahi bridge.

Masjid Jama ash Sharq (Jama Masjid)

The Jama Masjid is another of the Sharqi dynasty period, started by Ibrahim Shah Sharqi and after a number of construction phases, completed by Hussain Shah. It is located on the Shahganj road near the Purani bazaar in Jaunpur City. The size of the masjid interior is  x . 27 steps climb to the top. There are four gates, one at each cardinal point. The eastern gateway was destroyed by Sikander Lodhi. The masjid is decorated with Egyptian style engravings and lotus, sunflower and rose motifs.

Lal Darwaza Masjid
The masjid occupies  x  and has three entrances and a courtyard. It is also known as the "Red Portal Masjid".

Shahi Pul

The Shahi Pul is a bridge over the Gomti river at Jaunpur township. It was built by Khankhana in 1564 for Akbar. At each end were pillboxes to house stalls. On a square platform in the middle of the bridge, there is a large sculpture of a lion with an elephant underneath its forepaws. The statue originated in a Buddhist monastery. There is an associated mosque at Idgah on the Allahabad road.

Shahi Qila
In 1462, Firoz Shah III built the Shahi Qila (the imperial fort). The Kerar Kot fort once stood on the same site in Jaunpur township on the north bank of the Gomti river. It contained a mosque and a spacious and stylish set of baths (hammam) installed by Ibrahim, Firoz's brother. The layout of the fort is an irregular quadrangle enclosed in stone walls. The walls surround raised earthworks. Most of the remains of the original structures are buried or in ruin.

The main gates face east. Its external surface is set with ashlar stone. A further, outer, gate was installed during the reign of the Mughal king, Akbar, under the patronage of the governor of Jaunpur, Min'im Khan in the 16th century. It is designed in the shape of a flanking bastion. The spandrels or spaces between the arches of the outer gate were decorated with blue and yellow tiles. Ornamental niches are built into the walls of the outer gate. The two story residential and administrative building or "palace" was built in a square layout. An interior pillared verandah or aiwan overlooked the ground floor from the first.

The mosque or masjid is likely the oldest building in Jaunpur township. It was a simple arcade of about  x . It was supported by pillars in the Bengali style. There are three low central domes and no minars. (There are two nearby stone pillars instead).

Sheetla Chowkiya Dham
Located at Chowkiya, Panchhatiya, the temple is devoted to goddess Shitala, who resides in the main temple of the complex. There are other temples of god and goddess of mostly of the local deities. There is also a pond.The temple is very much popular among the locals. It is believed that before leaving the district, it's necessary to take blessings of Mata Sheetla for safety and well-being. There is a Neem tree in temple believed to be more than 300 years old.

Raja Ki Haveli 

It is situated on Panchatiya Road. The palace of royal family of Jaunpur was once owned by Raja Yadvendra Dutt Dubey. Now the palace has been converted into Wedding Lawn. The palace also has a Pokhra where events like Ravan Dahan and Dussehra mela takes place every year.

Notable people 

 Dinesh Kunwar Patel, developer of world's first homemade humanoid Robot "Shalu" that can speak 47 languages (from Rajamalpur village in Mariahu, Jaunpur)
Sharadindu Bandyopadhyay - Indian Bengali language writer and script writer in Bollywood. Creator of the famous detective character Byomkesh Bakshi and also huge number of historical fiction novels and short stories in Bengali language.
Ashok Bhushan - Judge at the Supreme Court of India and was 31st Chief Justice of Kerala High Court
Muhammad Yunus Jawnpuri, Indian hadith scholar and former Shaykh al-Hadith of Mazahir Uloom, Saharanpur.
Ravi Kishan - Actor and MP
Mohammad Akram Nadwi - Dean faculty of Islamic studies Oxford University London
Acharya Ramamurti - Indian social activist (Gandhian) and educationist
Rambhadracharya - Hindu spiritual leader, poet, commentator, educationist, religious and social figure
 Gaurav Yadav, DGP of Punjab Police
Indu Prakash Singh - Philosopher, economist, politician and former diplomat with the Indian Foreign Service
 Justice Surendra Kumar Yadav Special Judge in Demolition of the Babri Masjid case
Tufani Saroj - Former Member of Parliament Machhlishahr
Lalji Singh - Scientist who worked in the field of DNA fingerprinting technology
Rajesh Vivek - Actor
Jagmohan Yadav - Former IPS police officer and former Director-General of Uttar Pradesh Police
Parasnath Yadava - Former MP and former Cabinet minister of Uttar Pradesh Government
Shailendra Yadav Lalai - MLA Shahganj and former minister of Uttar Pradesh Government

Temples
Bijethua Mahavir

References

External links

 
 First website of Jaunpur in Hindi
 First website of Jaunpur in English

 
Districts of Uttar Pradesh